Skogsvågen or Skogsvåg is a village in Øygarden municipality in Vestland county, Norway.  The village is located on the eastern coast of the island of Sotra in the northern part of the municipality, just northeast of the village of Hammarsland.  The village is the site of Sund senter (a shopping center), Skogsvåg kindergarten, Skogsvåg stadium, Sotra Upper Secondary School, and the Sund og Sundheimen nursing home. 

The village was the administrative centre of Sund municipality until 2020.

References

Villages in Vestland
Øygarden